The Silverton Tramway Y class was a class of 2-6-0 and 2-6-2T steam locomotives operated by the Silverton Tramway Company of Australia.

History
Between 1888 and 1907 the Silverton Tramway Company took delivery of eighteen 2-6-0 and two 2-6-2T locomotives from Beyer, Peacock & Co, Manchester. One James Martin & Co built example was purchased second-hand from the Tarrawingee Tramway.

Having commenced operations with hired South Australian Railways Y class locomotives, the Silverton Tramway Company ordered four locomotives of the same design from Beyer, Peacock & Co.  These were assembled in Gawler South Australia by James Martin's Phoenix Foundry, It had an option to on sell any that it deemed surplus to the South Australian Railways, hence the original Y3 and Y4 passed without use. The Silverton Tramway Company notionally had 21 locomotives of this type, although three were never operated and only a maximum of 17 were owned at any one time with numbers recycled.

Westinghouse air brakes were fitted to Y13, Y15 and Y16 from new with Y1 and Y11 retrofitted. Y1, Y6, Y8 and Y11 to Y17 were rebuilt with 180psi (originally 145psi) boilers with lead adhesion slabs added to the running boards. Three were superheated between 1924 and 1926.

They were superseded on main line duties by the A class from 1912 onwards, but many were retained for shunting and secondary duties around the Broken Hill yards and mine sidings. The last was withdrawn in 1961.

Class list

Preservation
Y1: at Sulphide Street Museum
Y6: at Mount Laura Homestead Museum
Y11: at Penrose Park, Silverton in September 1965
Y12: at the National Railway Museum, Port Adelaide

References

Beyer, Peacock locomotives
Railway locomotives introduced in 1888
Silverton Tramway
Steam locomotives of New South Wales
2-6-0 locomotives
2-6-2T locomotives
3 ft 6 in gauge locomotives of Australia